Ffoshelyg is a hamlet in Ceredigion, Wales.

The estate at Ffoshelyg was once owned by Hugh Lloyd (fl. 1608). As of 2016 it is dominated by a family-run caravan park.

References

Villages in Ceredigion